The MV Sage Sagittarius is a bulk carrier built in 2000. The vessel is operated by the NYK Line.

In 2012 three men died aboard the vessel on a routine return voyage from Japan to Newcastle to pick up a bulk load of coal. Australian authorities were notified, and the ship turned around, and a 36-hour search commenced.

A company official, Kosaku Monji, was dispatched to investigate and landed in Brisbane and helicoptered to the vessel along with two security officers. The ship was diverted to Port Kembla and was met by a large number of Australian Federal Police officers who searched the ship and collected evidence. Although all of the crew had not been interviewed, the ship proceeded to Newcastle, where the body of the chief engineer, Hector Collado, was found with multiple injuries after having toppled over the edge of a railing and fallen  as the ship berthed. New South Wales Police officers investigated, with many of the seamen being taken from the vessel to be interviewed. Nearly all the crew and the captain of the vessel were flown out of the country two days later. Four days after the second death, the vessel steamed out of Newcastle and back to Japan, where it berthed at Kudamatsu Port two weeks later. The ship was unloaded for three days when the body of Kosaku Monji was found crushed in a conveyor belt.

References

Bulk carriers
Maritime incidents in 2012
2000 ships